The Junior women's race at the 2000 IAAF World Cross Country Championships was held at the Sporting Complex in Vilamoura, Portugal, on March 18, 2000.  Reports onf the event were given in The New York Times, in the Glasgow Herald, and for the IAAF.

Complete results for individuals, for teams, medallists, and the results of British athletes who took part were published.

Race results

Junior women's race (6.29 km)

Individual

Teams

Note: Athletes in parentheses did not score for the team result

Participation
An unofficial count yields the participation of 131 athletes from 36 countries in the Junior women's race.  This is in agreement with the official numbers as published.  The announced athlete from  did not show.

 (6)
 (4)
 (4)
 (4)
 (1)
 (6)
 (4)
 (1)
 (2)
 (6)
 (4)
 (1)
 (4)
 (1)
 (6)
 (1)
 (6)
 (1)
 (6)
 (1)
 (6)
 (4)
 (1)
 (5)
 (6)
 (2)
 (1)
 (3)
 (5)
 (4)
 (5)
 (6)
 (6)
 (4)
 (2)
 (2)

See also
 2000 IAAF World Cross Country Championships – Senior men's race
 2000 IAAF World Cross Country Championships – Men's short race
 2000 IAAF World Cross Country Championships – Junior men's race
 2000 IAAF World Cross Country Championships – Senior women's race
 2000 IAAF World Cross Country Championships – Women's short race

References

Junior women's race at the World Athletics Cross Country Championships
IAAF World Cross Country Championships
2000 in women's athletics
2000 in youth sport